Fleet Foxes is the debut studio album by American band Fleet Foxes, released on June 3, 2008, by Sub Pop and Bella Union.  The album garnered wide praise from critics, many of whom named it one of the best albums of the 2000s and one of the greatest debut albums of all time.

Recording
Producer and Pecknold family friend Phil Ek had earlier helped Fleet Foxes record their first demo and used his influence to assist in shopping it to record labels. Ek described the demo as "a very different sound but [...] still very good." According to the producer it was when Robin began writing differently that he thought it was time to do something "for real".

The resulting album was recorded with Ek over the course of a year. As Sub Pop and Bella Union had yet to get involved with the band at this point, the recording was funded by the group themselves.

Cover art
The cover art is a detail of the 1559 painting Netherlandish Proverbs by Pieter Bruegel the Elder. Vocalist/guitarist Robin Pecknold notes that:

When you first see that painting it's very bucolic, but when you look closer there's all this really strange stuff going on, like dudes defecating coins into the river and people on fire, people carving a live sheep, this weird dude who looks like a tree root sitting around with a dog. There's all this really weird stuff going on. I liked that the first impression is that it's just pretty, but then you realize that the scene is this weird chaos. I like that you can't really take it for what it is, that your first impression of it is wrong.

Pecknold explained to Mojo how the painting ended up on the front cover:

We were trying to figure out what we wanted to do, and my brother had been working out some stuff, when I saw that Bruegel painting in a book my girlfriend had. I liked that it had a really intriguing meaning, like there's a story to each little scene. Which I just felt fitting for that record- dense but unified, not a collage or anything. And I liked its Where's Waldo? quality, that it was something you could look at for a long time on a vinyl sleeve and find new little things.

It was very easy to get the museum in Berlin that has it to say yes. They were super excited a band wanted to use it and put it in their newsletter. When you open it up on the inside there's a paisley pattern traced from the back of a book that Skye (Skjelset, lead guitar)'s mum got me. We wanted two very different feelings.

The cover claimed the Best Art Vinyl Award 2008, an annual award, organized by Artvinyl.com, a company that manufactures display frames for record albums.

Reception

Fleet Foxes received widespread acclaim from the music critics. At Metacritic, which assigns a normalized rating out of 100 to reviews from mainstream critics, the album has an average score of 87 out of 100 based on 31 reviews, indicating "universal acclaim". The Guardian described it to be "a landmark in American music, an instant classic". Similar praise was put upon the album by AllMusic, which stated that "Fleet Foxes is such a satisfying, self-assured debut".

Uncut magazine awarded the album their inaugural Uncut Award in 2008 for "the most rewarding album of the past 12 months". Q magazine voted it the second best album of 2008 while it topped The Times "100 best records of 2008" list. and captured the #3 slot on WERS Boston's Top 50 of 2008 list. The album was also reviewed on the 'In A Word' section of the weekly podcast EGGCAST, where it was described as 'cosy' and 'organic'.  Mojo gave the debut the seldom-awarded "Instant Classic" label. Until Joanna Newsom's Have One On Me in the April 2010 issue, it was the last album to receive this honor. Geddy Lee of Rush included this album among his favourites in a list from an interview with The Quietus. The album was ranked #36 on Rolling Stone's 2013 list of the 40 Greatest Stoner Albums, and 88th on The Guardians 100 Best Albums of the 21st Century list, based on a 2019 poll of music writers.

The album sold over 100,000 copies in the United Kingdom by the end of 2008, making it the first gold certificate record released by label Bella Union. By November 2013, it had sold over 500,000 copies in the United States.

Accolades

 Track listing 
All songs written by Robin Pecknold.

Disc one

Disc two (2008 Limited Edition)

Disc two (2009 Japanese Limited Edition)

PersonnelFleet FoxesRobin Pecknold – band member, songwriter, arranger, design (uncredited: lead vocals, guitar)
Skyler Skjelset – band member, arranger (uncredited: lead guitar)
Nicholas Peterson – band member, arranger (uncredited: drums, percussion, vocals)
Casey Wescott – band member, arranger (uncredited: keyboards, vocals)
Craig Curran – band member, arranger (uncredited: bass, vocals)Additional instrumental personnelGwen Owen – flute on "Your Protector"Production personnel'
Phil Ek – producer, engineer, mixer
Ed Brooks – mastering
Sasha Barr – design
Dusty Summers – design

The liner notes do not state which instruments the band members play. Former drummer J. Tillman joined the group after recordings had been completed, but before the album was released.

Charts

Weekly charts

Year-end charts

Certifications

References

External links
"White Winter Hymnal" music video on YouTube
"He Doesn't Know Why" music video on YouTube
"Mykonos" music video on YouTube

Fleet Foxes albums
2008 debut albums
Albums produced by Phil Ek
Bella Union albums
Sub Pop albums